Charlie Bynar is an American painter.

Personal life
Charlie Bynar was born in 1966 in Sun Valley, Idaho. Bynar married her husband David Calley in 1993, with whom she had one child, Isaac. Calley is the founder of Southwest Windpower. Isaac died of a seizure in 2017 at the age of sixteen. Following his death, Charlie Bynar founded the Isaac’s Ant Foundation, which along with the Babbitt Brothers Foundation developed a memorial exhibition featuring honeypot ant farms at the Museum of Northern Arizona, where her son had worked with the insects. The exhibition was entitled The Ant Empire: Strength in Community and opened in February 2019. Through the foundation, Bynar also founded an endowment at Coconino Community College for scholarships meant for special needs individuals pursuing science education.

Art career
As an illustrator, Bynar was the recipient of the Scholastic Art Award in both 1983 and 1984. In 1988 she began to exhibit her artworks publicly at the Macy's Coffee Shop in Flagstaff, Arizona. Around this time she began to accept commissions for portraits, some of which were exhibited in other locations around the US. Other locations in Flagstaff where her work was hung include the Hudgens Gallery and the Coconino Center For The Arts. Bynar largely works with watercolors in her paintings, but does work in other mediums. In 2021 Bynar published the illustrated children’s book “Charlie and the Rainbow Trout”.

References

External links
 Isaac's Ant Foundation

American watercolorists
21st-century American artists
20th-century American artists
Artists from Idaho
Artists from Arizona
Women watercolorists
1966 births
Living people
People from Sun Valley, Idaho